The Feast at Swan Goose Gate, also known as the Banquet at Hongmen, Hongmen Banquet, Hongmen Feast and other similar renditions, was a historical event that took place in 206 BC at Hong Gate outside Xianyang, the capital of the Qin dynasty. Its location in present-day China is roughly at Hongmenbao Village, Xinfeng Town, Lintong District, Xi'an, Shaanxi province. The main parties involved in the banquet were Liu Bang and Xiang Yu, two prominent leaders of insurgent forces who rebelled against the Qin dynasty from 209–206 BC.

The Feast at Hong Gate is often memorialised in Chinese history, fiction and popular culture.  The event was one of the highlights of power struggle between Liu Bang and Xiang Yu leading up to the outbreak of the Chu–Han Contention, a violent civil war for supremacy over China which concluded with Xiang Yu's suicide in the Battle of Gaixia and Liu Bang's ascension as the founding emperor of the newly established Han dynasty.

Background

Between 209 BC and 206 BC, rebellions erupted throughout China to overthrow the Qin dynasty. Some of these insurgent forces claimed to be restoring the former six states which were annexed by the Qin state in a series of wars from 230–221 BC. Liu Bang and Xiang Yu were two prominent leaders who emerged from among the rebels. In 208 BC, Xiang Yu and his uncle Xiang Liang installed King Huai II as the nominal ruler of the Chu state while they were actually the ones in power. In late 208 BC, Xiang Liang was killed in action at the Battle of Dingtao so the Chu military came under King Huai II's control. King Huai II sent Xiang Yu and Liu Bang to lead two separate forces to attack the Qin heartland of Guanzhong, and promised that whoever entered that region first would be granted the title of "King of Guanzhong".

In late 207 BC, Liu Bang's rebel army conquered Wu Pass and seized control of Guanzhong and the Qin capital Xianyang. The last Qin emperor Ziying surrendered to Liu Bang, marking the end of the Qin dynasty. After occupying Xianyang, Liu Bang gave strict orders to his men, forbidding them from looting and pillaging the city and harming the civilian populace. Liu Bang also sent troops to garrison at Hangu Pass to block Xiang Yu from entering Guanzhong. Around the time, Xiang Yu's force had just defeated a Qin army led by Zhang Han at the Battle of Julu. When Xiang Yu arrived at Hangu Pass, he was displeased to hear that Liu Bang had already occupied Guanzhong, so he attacked and conquered the pass, pushing on to west of Xishui (戲水). Liu Bang and his army were based in Bashang (霸上) then. The strengths of Xiang Yu and Liu Bang's forces then were estimated to be 400,000 and 100,000 respectively.

Prelude

Cao Wushang (曹無傷), a defector from Liu Bang's side, secretly sent a messenger to Xiang Yu's camp, telling Xiang that Liu Bang was planning to declare himself "King of Guanzhong" in accordance with King Huai II's earlier promise, while Ziying would be Liu's chancellor. Cao Wushang also added that Liu Bang had seized all the riches of Xianyang for himself. Xiang Yu was furious when he heard this and planned to attack Liu Bang. Xiang Yu's advisor Fan Zeng felt that Liu Bang posed a threat to his lord so he urged Xiang Yu to eliminate Liu Bang as soon as possible.

One of Xiang Yu's uncles, Xiang Bo, shared a close friendship with Liu Bang's advisor Zhang Liang. Xiang Bo feared for his friend's life so he sneaked to Liu Bang's camp to warn Zhang Liang about the peril he was in, telling Zhang to flee. Liu Bang was shocked when Zhang Liang related the news to him, and he sought advice from Zhang to avoid danger. Zhang Liang instructed Liu Bang to enlist the help of Xiang Bo to reduce Xiang Yu's suspicions. Liu Bang met Xiang Bo and treated him like an honoured guest, flattering Xiang Bo and pretending to arrange for a marriage between his son and Xiang Bo's daughter while asking Xiang Bo to plead with Xiang Yu on his behalf. When Xiang Bo returned to Xiang Yu's camp later, he assured his nephew that Liu Bang had no ill intentions, and conveyed Liu Bang's message that he was willing to submit to Xiang Yu.

Feast

The following day, Liu Bang brought around 100 men with him to meet Xiang Yu at Hong Gate (鴻門), where Xiang had prepared a banquet to entertain him. Liu Bang explained that he managed to enter Guanzhong first because of sheer luck, and apologised to Xiang Yu for robbing him of his glory while extolling Xiang's valour in battle. Liu Bang also explained that the misunderstanding was caused by vile words from someone plotting to sow discord between him and Xiang Yu. Xiang Yu then pointed out that it was Cao Wushang who told him about Liu Bang's supposed intentions. He invited Liu Bang to partake in the banquet.

The main parties involved in the feast were seated in the following arrangement: Xiang Yu and Xiang Bo faced east; Fan Zeng faced south; Liu Bang faced north; Zhang Liang faced west (known as servant's seat).  By the custom of Qin, the east-facing seat is the most respectable place, usually reserved for the guest (in this case would have been Liu Bang), while south-facing seat is reserved for the Emperor, while his servant ministers would be facing north; thus, the seating arrangement indicates that Xiang Yu merely treat Liu Bang as one of his underling; while Liu Bang, by taking the north facing seat, accepted his subservient role and thus would not harm Xiang Yu.

During the banquet, Fan Zeng made signals and hinted many times to Xiang Yu to kill Liu Bang, but Xiang ignored him. Fan Zeng then summoned Xiang Yu's cousin Xiang Zhuang, instructing him to pretend to perform a sword dance to entertain the guests and find an opportunity to assassinate Liu Bang. Xiang Zhuang started dancing after Xiang Yu approved, but Xiang Bo offered to join the performance and he blocked Xiang Zhuang with his body whenever the latter thrust his sword towards Liu Bang.

In the meantime, Zhang Liang left the feast and went outside to summon Liu Bang's general Fan Kuai. He gave some instructions to Fan Kuai and returned to his seat. Fan Kuai then burst into the banquet area despite not being invited, dressed in full armour and armed with his sword and shield, interrupting the sword dance and glaring at Xiang Yu. Xiang Yu was impressed with Fan Kuai's bravado and asked for his name, calling him a "brave warrior" (壯士). He ordered his men to give Fan Kuai a goblet of wine, which Fan gulped down. Xiang Yu then offered Fan Kuai a cut of meat (a pork shoulder). Fan Kuai placed the meat on his shield and used his sword to cut off chunks and eat. Xiang Yu was even more impressed and he asked Fan Kuai if he wanted more wine. Fan Kuai then made a lengthy speech about Liu Bang's accomplishments, stating how it would be unjust for Xiang Yu to kill Liu, but also implicitly affirming that Liu would not challenge Xiang's authority.

Xiang Yu did not respond and he invited Fan Kuai to join the banquet.

Liu Bang's escape

Liu Bang later said that he needed to use the latrine so he left the banquet with Fan Kuai. Shortly after, Xiang Yu sent Chen Ping to call Liu Bang back to the feast. Liu Bang felt that he should bid Xiang Yu farewell but Fan Kuai opposed his decision.

Fan Kuai was essentially reminding Liu Bang that their lives were in Xiang Yu's hands and they should escape as soon as they had a chance. He then chose a horse for Liu Bang to ride and Liu escaped, with Fan Kuai, Xiahou Ying, Jin Jiang (靳疆) and Ji Xin accompanying him on foot.

Before his escape, Liu Bang gave Zhang Liang a pair of jade tablets and a pair of jade measuring cups, telling him to present them to Xiang Yu and Fan Zeng respectively. Zhang Liang returned to his seat and presented the gifts to Xiang Yu and Fan Zeng, while apologising on Liu Bang's behalf for leaving without bidding farewell and giving an excuse that Liu was already drunk and unable to continue participating in the feast. Xiang Yu accepted the jade tablets but Fan Zeng threw the jade cups to the ground and cut them to pieces with his sword, predicting that Liu Bang would take away the empire from Xiang Yu one day.

Liu Bang had Cao Wushang executed after returning to his camp.

Aftermath
Fan Zeng's prediction came true in 202 BC as Xiang Yu eventually lost to Liu Bang in the power struggle for supremacy over China from 206–202 BC, known as the Chu–Han Contention. Xiang Yu committed suicide after his defeat at the Battle of Gaixia, while Liu Bang established the Han dynasty and became its first emperor.

Cultural references
In Chinese culture, the term Hong Men Yan ("Feast at Swan Goose Gate") is used figuratively to refer to a trap or a situation ostensibly joyous but in fact treacherous. Another idiom that relates to the event is "項莊舞劍，意在沛公" 
(), meaning that a person's actions were intended to be a veiled attack on another person.

The Chinese title of the 2011 film White Vengeance is a reference to the Feast at Hong Gate, while the plot itself is based on this historical incident and other events in the Chu–Han Contention. 
The Chinese film The Last Supper from 2012 is also an adaptation of this incident.

See also
 List of dining events
 Timeline of the Chu–Han Contention

References 

 Sima Qian. Records of the Grand Historian, vols. 7, 8.
 Ban Gu et al. Book of Han, vol. 1.
 Sima Guang. Zizhi Tongjian, vol. 9.

Han dynasty
206 BC
Dining events
Chu–Han Contention